The Horse, The Rat, and The Swan is the second studio album for Perth band, Snowman. It was released on 24 May 2008 on Dot Dash Recordings.  Snowman produced the album with Dave Parkin (The Panda Band, Red Jezebel) at Blackbird Studios in Perth, Western Australia.
In an interview lead singer, Joe McKee explains the reasoning behind the name of the album.

McKee goes on to explain how the band went around creating the album.

The first single to be lifted off the album was "We Are The Plague".

Track listing
All songs were written by Snowman.
 "Our Mother (She Remembers)" - 2:58
 "We Are The Plague" - 3:27
 "The Gods Of The Upper House" - 4:04
 "The Blood Of The Swan" - 3:43
 "Daniel Was A Timebomb" - 2:37
 "A Re-Birth" - 3:25
 "She Is Turning Into You" - 5:36
 "The Horse (Parts 1 and 2)" - 6:00
 "Diamond Wounds" - 6:16

References

2008 albums
Snowman (band) albums
Albums produced by Dave Parkin
Dot Dash Recordings albums